Edwin Albert "Ed" Oman (August 31, 1930 – September 19, 2013) was a provincial level politician from Alberta, Canada.

Political career
Oman was elected as a Member of the Legislative Assembly of Alberta representing the Calgary North Hill electoral district in the 1979 Alberta general election. He won easily over second place challenger Dennis Shupe from the Social Credit party and three other candidates to hold the district for the Progressive Conservatives. He was re-elected to a second term in office in the 1982 Alberta general election winning a landslide. He defeated challenger Agnes Middleton from the NDP and two other candidates. Oman retired from provincial politics at the end of his second term in office.

Oman died of pancreatic cancer September 19, 2013 in Calgary.

References

External links
Legislative Assembly of Alberta Members Listing

Progressive Conservative Association of Alberta MLAs
2013 deaths
1930 births
Calgary city councillors